Q-Tee (born Tatiana Mais, 1976 in Kidbrooke, London) is a British rapper.

She provided rapping vocals on two songs by Saint Etienne; the first of these being "Filthy" (B-side to "Only Love Can Break Your Heart" and also released on Smash The System: Singles and More) and the second being "Calico" (on So Tough). At the time she recorded these songs she was 15 years old. In 1990, she was the featured vocalist on History's UK No. 42 hit, "Afrika".

In 1993, Q-Tee provided rapping vocals on "Beautiful" by Babble, who were essentially the last two remaining members of Thompson Twins. It was released on their album, The Stone (Warner Bros./Reprise Records), and remixes were also released on the double A-side single, "Beautiful"/"Tribe".

She was signed to a recording contract to Saint Etienne's label, Heavenly Records in her own right four years later, and released one song, "Gimme That Body" in January 1996. The single reached No. 40 in the UK Singles Chart. She also provided rapping vocals on Mark Morrison's 1996 single "Horny".

References

External links
 Q-Tee Bio

1976 births
Living people
English women rappers
Heavenly Recordings artists
People from the Royal Borough of Greenwich
Black British women rappers
Rappers from London